Rade Todorović (Serbian Cyrillic: Paдe Toдopoвић ; born 21 May 1974) is a Serbian former footballer who played as a right midfielder.

Career
Todorović was born in Kraljevo.

He spent one season in the Bundesliga with 1. FC Nürnberg.

Some other clubs he has played for are FK Sloga Kraljevo, OFK Beograd, FK Sutjeska Nikšić, PFC Slavia Sofia, FK Napredak Kruševac, FC Kryvbas Kryvyi Rih and FC Amur Blagoveshchensk.

A youth football tournament held in Kraljevo on 19 January 2009 was named "Balon Todorović" in his honour.

References

External links
 Rade Todorović at Srbijafudbal
 
 

Living people
1974 births
Sportspeople from Kraljevo
Association football midfielders
Serbian footballers
Serbian expatriate footballers
OFK Beograd players
FK Sutjeska Nikšić players
PFC Slavia Sofia players
1. FC Nürnberg players
FK Napredak Kruševac players
FK Sloga Kraljevo players
FC Kryvbas Kryvyi Rih players
First Professional Football League (Bulgaria) players
Bundesliga players
Ukrainian Premier League players
Expatriate footballers in Bulgaria
Expatriate footballers in Germany
Serbia and Montenegro expatriate footballers
Expatriate footballers in Ukraine
Serbia and Montenegro expatriate sportspeople in Ukraine
Expatriate footballers in Russia
FC Amur Blagoveshchensk players